Misfit, in comics, may refer to:

 Misfit (Marvel Comics), a male supervillain.
 Misfit (DC Comics), a female vigilante.

See also
Misfit (disambiguation)